Triflupromazine (Vesprin) is an antipsychotic medication of the phenothiazine class. Among different effects of triflupromazine indication for use of this drug is severe emesis and severe Hiccups. Due to its potential side effects (triflupromazine has higher risk for side effects than many other antipsychotics) it is not gold standard in antiemetic therapy.

Serious side effects of triflupromazine can be akathisia and tardive dyskinesia as well as the rare, but potentially fatal, neuroleptic malignant syndrome.

References

Dimethylamino compounds
Dopamine antagonists
Phenothiazines
Trifluoromethyl compounds
Typical antipsychotics
Antipsychotics